The Minneapolis Archeological Site (14OT5) near Minneapolis, Kansas, United States, was listed on the National Register of Historic Places in 1972 for its information potential as an archeological site.

It is a prehistoric village site in Ottawa County, Kansas. It is the premier site of its phase, the Smoky Hill phase.

A bison scapula hoe is one artifact found at the site.

External links
 Platform Pipe from the Minneapolis Site, 14OT5, Dates: 1232 CE-1409 CE

References

Archaeological sites on the National Register of Historic Places in Kansas
Ottawa County, Kansas
Plains Village period
Former Native American populated places in the United States
Native American history of Kansas